The 7th Battalion, The Rifles (7 RIFLES) is an Army Reserve battalion of the British Army originally formed in 1999 as an independent regiment, however later became part of The Rifles following the Future Army Structure programme, and remains an integral part of the regiment.

Royal Rifle Volunteers

Formation 
In 1999, the Territorial Army (TA) was reorganised, in what became part of the Strategic Defence Review, with an emphasis on the reduction of the infantry and expansion of the armoured (yeomanry) and royal artillery (air defence elements).  On 1 July 1999, the Royal Rifle Volunteers (RRV) was formed through the amalgamation of the following battalions: 6th/7th (Volunteer) Battalion, Princess of Wales's Royal Regiment (part), 2nd (Volunteer) Battalion, Royal Gloucestershire, Berkshire and Wiltshire Regiment (part), and 5th (Volunteer) Battalion, Royal Green Jackets.  The new regiment becoming the TA infantry regiment for the South Central area.

The new regiment's structure on formation was as follows:

 Regimental Headquarters, at Brock Barracks, Reading
 A (Royal Green Jackets) Company, in Oxford – from amalgamation of HQ & A Coys, 5th (V) Bn, Royal Green Jackets
 Anti-Tank Platoon, in High Wycombe (later moved to E Coy)
Waterloo Band and Bugles, at Slade Park Barracks, Headington – inherited by 5 RGR
 (B) Royal Gloucestershire, Berkshire, and Wiltshire Company, at Brock Barracks, Reading – from HQ & C Coys, 2nd (V) Bn, Royal Gloucestershire, Berkshire, and Wiltshire Regiment
 Rifle Platoon, in Swindon
 C (Princess of Wales's Royal Regiment) Company, in Portsmouth – from C Coy, 6th/7th (V) Bn, Princess of Wales's Royal Regiment
 9 (Princess Beatrice's Isle of Wight Rifles) Platoon, in Newport
 E (Royal Green Jackets) Company, in Milton Keynes – from E Coy, 5th (V) Bn, Royal Green Jackets

The new regiment was placed under command of the 145th (South) Brigade, which in 2000, was redesignation as the 145th (Home Counties) Brigade.  The regiment was, and would remain the only infantry unit in the brigade, sitting alongside its University Officer Training Corps counterparts.

Future Army Structure 
On 1 April 2000 9 (PBIWR) Platoon was redesignated as 9 (Isle of Wight) Platoon, losing its connection with Princess Beatrice's Isle of Wight Rifles.

In 2003, the Future Army Structure programme was announced, which would see the infantry of the army reorganised into new "Large Regiments".  On 22 July 2005, the RGBW Company was redesignated as B (RGBW) Company and consolidated in Reading, and on 1 April 2006, the battalion was reorganised in preparation for its integration into the Rifles into the following:

 Battalion Headquarters, at Brock Barracks, Reading
Headquarters Company, at Brock Barracks, Reading – from amalgamation of HQ & B Coy
Waterloo Band and Bugles, at Slade Park Barracks, Headington – inherited by 5 RGR
 A (Royal Green Jackets) Company, at Edward Brooks Barracks, Abingdon-on-Thames
Platoon in Marlow
 E (Royal Green Jackets) Company, at John Howard Barracks, Blakelands
 F (Royal Green Jackets) Company, at Davies Street drill hall, Mayfair, London (transferred from the London Regiment)
 G (Royal Green Jackets) Company, in West Ham, London (from the London Regiment)

In addition the above structure changes, C (PWRR) Coy was transferred to the 3rd (Volunteer) Battalion, Princess of Wales's Royal Regiment.

Deployments 
In February 2003, a company of RRV were deployed to Afghanistan under OP Fingal. It was the 1st large scale mobilisation of reserves since the 2nd World War. They were later joined by a regular company from 1 Royal Anglian.

In March 2004, a composite platoon was formed with personnel from across the regiment and deployed to Iraq on Operation Telic VI.  In November the platoon joined the 20th Armoured Brigade and deployed in Basra.  In May 2005, it returned to the United Kingdom and was demobilised shortly thereafter.

In February 2005, Roebuck Company was formed and mobilised with personnel from across the regiment.  On the 18 May 2005, the company arrived in Iraq and assumed it role on 27 March 2005 of providing force protection for HQ MND (SE), initially under Command of the Rear Ops BG and later under Force Protection Wing , Basra Air Station.  On 26 November 2005 the company was relieved and returned to the UK, initially returning to Bodney Camp, Norfolk, until demobilisation. Elements of the regiment also served in Northern Ireland (Operation Banner), Bosnia and Herzegovina (SFOR), Autonomous Province of Kosovo and Metohija (KFOR), and Sierra Leone (Operation Palliser).

On 26 January 2006, Secretary of State for Defence John Reid announced members of the regiment would deploy alongside HQ Allied Rapid Reaction Corps to provide force protection at, what would later become, Camp Bastion.  30 Soldiers of the regiment then formed Salamanca Platoon, which deployed with Task Force Helmand from April to September 2006.

7th Battalion, The Rifles

Formation 
On 1 February 2007, regimental headquarters was reduced to a battalion headquarters and renamed as the 7th Battalion, The Rifles (7 RIFLES).  Following the regiment's integration into The Rifles, the Waterloo Band became the Waterloo Band of the Rifles.  After its redesignation, the regiment remained under 145th Bde and remained as a light infantry battalion.

Army 2020 
In 2013, a restructuring the Army was announced, Army 2020, which would help the army become more deployable and quicker-reacting.  Part of this reform was the redesignation of Support Command, with its subordinate divisions disbanding and most brigades being disbanded.  145th Bde merged with 11th Light Brigade in Lisburn, and 2nd (South East) Brigade at Folkestone to form the 11th Infantry Brigade and Headquarters South East at Aldershot Garrison forming the new regional HQ.  Under this reform the 7 RIFLES joined 38th (Irish) Brigade and was paired with 2 RIFLES based in Lisburn, Northern Ireland.

Under this reorganisation, the battalion itself was reorganised with the following changes occurring: Aylesbury Platoon, A Coy disbanded, and the company consolidated in Abingdon-on-Thames.  E Coy converted and redesignated as No. 678 (The Rifles) Squadron, Army Air Corps with Marlow Platoon becoming Marlow Troop, 871 Postal & Courier Squadron RLC.  F & G Companies remained unchanged.  In addition, all company subtitles were removed.

Army 2020 Refine 
In 2015, a further supplement was published to the previous Army 2020 plan, entitled "Army 2020", which saw the battalion expand, change role, and move formation.  As part of this refine, the battalion was moved under the 20th Armoured Infantry Brigade,  equipped with Warrior Infantry Fighting Vehicles (thereby becoming 'Armoured Infantry'), de-linked with 2 RIFLES from the formation of 8 RIFLES in 2018, and paired with 5 RIFLES.

Under the reforms, A Coy moved to High Wycombe and formed two new platoons in Aylesbury and Marlow, a new B Coy formed in Swindon and Bulford, a new C Company formed in Reading ( taking responsibility for the Assault Pioneer Platoon from HQ Coy) and F Company was moved to the London Regiment, G Company added outstations in Mile End and Kensington, HQ Coy remained in Reading.

The battalion's new, and current, structure is as follows as of April 2021:

 Battalion Headquarters, at Iverna Gardens drill hall, Kensington 
Headquarters Company, at Brock Barracks, Reading
 Waterloo Band and Bugles of the Rifles, at Edward Brooks Barracks, Abingdon-on-Thames
 A Company, at Edward Brooks Barracks, Abingdon-on-Thames
 1 Platoon, at Viney House, Aylesbury
 2 Platoon, at Youens House, High Wycombe
 B Company, in Swindon
 6 (Bulford) Platoon, at Ward Barracks, Bulford Camp
C Company, at Brock Barracks, Reading
 G Company, in West Ham, London
Platoon, in Mile End, London
Platoon, in Kensington, London, collocated with BHQ.

Waterloo Band and Bugles 
Until 2009 the band was based at Slade Park Barracks, Oxford, but moved to Edward Brooks Barracks in Abingdon-on-Thames under Headquarters Company.

Colonels 
Royal Colonel

 February 2007–Present: Her Royal Highness Birgitte Henriksen, Duchess of Gloucester

Honorary Colonels

From 1999, Honorary Colonels of the companies are also 'Deputy Honorary Colonels' of the regiment.

 1 July 1999 – 1 September 2003: Lieutenant General Sir Hew Pike, HCB DSO MBE
 1 September 2003–: Major General David Julian Richards, CBE DSO

Deputy Honorary Colonels

 (1) 1 July 1999–????: Brigadier J. N. B. Mogg
 (2) 1 July 1999 – 1 September 2006: Colonel R. P. Bateman, TD
 (2) 1 September 2006–: xxxx
 (3) 1 July 1999–????: Brigadier R. M. Koe
 (4) 1 July 1999 – 1 January 2003: Colonel T. B. Dutton, OBE
 (4) 1 January 2003–????: Colonel S. J. Oxlade, MBE

Footnotes

References 

 
 
 

Military units and formations established in 2007
Military units and formations in Berkshire
Military units and formations in Buckinghamshire
Military units and formations in Oxfordshire
Military units and formations in Wiltshire
Military units and formations in London
The Rifles